Dash Rip Rock is an American rock band. Originally playing rockabilly and country music, the band is best known for its cowpunk sound, which mixes punk rock, rockabilly, hard rock, country and boogie. The New York Times stated that  Dash Rip Rock combines “fluency in American roots music with a robust dose of punk-rock spirit.” Bill Davis, Dash Rip Rock's founder and frontman, is a songwriter known for his blistering guitar work. Spin praised Dash Rip Rock as “undeniably the South’s greatest rock band.” In 2012, Dash Rip Rock was  inducted into the Louisiana Music Hall of Fame.

"Their roots sound's supercharged with energy and an overdose of irreverence, delivered with crunchy swagger," Creative Loafing wrote.

History
Guitarist, songwriter, and vocalist Bill Davis formed Dash Rip Rock as a three-piece band during the summer of 1984. Davis was influenced by the early 1980s American roots rock revival, embodied by such acts as Rank and File, The LeRoi Brothers, The Beat Farmers, The Stray Cats, and Jason & the Scorchers.

The other two original members were bassist Ned "Hoaky" Hickel and F. Clarke Martty on drums. All three were veterans of the post-punk scene. Originally, the band focused on revved up country and rockabilly, with Martty playing a simple stand-up drum kit and members sporting cowboy shirts, and bolo ties. Early shows included originals like "Marsupial" (the band's first single) and a fast rockabilly tune called "Shake That Girl" as well as rocked-out George Jones covers. The band began to build a strong following around their live cowpunk shows at clubs in Louisiana and throughout the South.

Over time, Dash evolved into a rock band that explored a wide variety of roots influences. Founding member Davis has kept the band touring and recording for more than 30 years. Martty was replaced by a succession of drummers, including Fred LeBlanc, Chris Luckette (formerly of The Normals and The Cold), Kyle Melancon, and Wade Hymel. Hickel left around 2000 and was replaced by Kenny Ames (formerly of Jason and the Scorchers). Patrick Johnson has also been Dash
s bassist.

"No one can replace Bill Davis," the Austin Chronicle wrote in 2008. "He’s the brains behind Dash’s brawn, a barroom poet with a wicked sense of humor and a shameless knack for a good lick. He doesn't mind taking good-natured potshots at New Orleans icons like Aaron Neville but he’s capable of writing memorable heartbreakers like “Endeavor.” Davis is often credited as a pioneer in "country punk," "cowpunk," and alt-country music that combines elements of rock with country and outlaw country with punk rock, but Davis has said in interviews that he considers his music to be widely roots-based.

Dash Rip Rock released a self-titled debut album in 1986 on 688 Records. In 1988 the band recorded its second album, Ace of Clubs,  on Mammoth Records. Dash Rip Rock toured with The Cramps, The Reverend Horton Heat, The dB's and others. In the 1990s, Dash Rip Rock's song "Let's Go Smoke Some Pot", a parody of Danny and the Juniors' "At the Hop" became a tongue-in-cheek staple of the band's live shows and a nationwide radio hit that has since been covered by many bands. Although the song has been adopted by some as a pro-marijuana song, it was actually intended to make fun of the resurgent popularity of Grateful Dead-style jam bands.

In 2005 Jello Biafra released Dash Rip Rock's retrospective CD Recyclone on the Alternative Tentacles label, followed in 2007 by Dash's first concept album, a punk rock opera based on Dante's Inferno, Hee Haw Hell. August 1, 2008 saw the release of a new studio album, Country Girlfriend.

In 2010, the Houston Press deemed DRR one of the "Top 10 Louisiana Bands of All Time." Bill Davis was also featured in the documentary, Outside Industry: The Story of SXSW. In 2010, Dash Rip Rock's song "Johnny Ace" was featured in the video game Rock Band.

In 2011, Bill Davis also joined Jello Biafra to form Jello Biafra and the New Orleans Raunch & Soul All-Stars. After selecting songs and recruiting musicians, DRR's Bill Davis and this one-time-only band of mostly-Louisiana rockers played a special show in New Orleans. The band featured Jello Biafra, Bill Davis (Dash Rip Rock), Pepper Keenan (DOWN and Corrosion of Conformity), and others.

In 2012, Dash Rip Rock was inducted into the Louisiana Music Hall of Fame. In November 2012, Alternative Tentacles Dash Rip Rock released DRR's new album Black Liquor. It was recorded at Studio in the Country in Bogalusa, Louisiana, and produced by Ben Mumphrey. Bill Davis of Dash Rip Rock also cut the track "Rock 'N' Roll Clown" for an album by  The Vibrators that was released on Cleopatra Records in 2013. Dash Rip Rock also recorded a tribute album to Billy Joe Shaver that was released in 2013 on Whiskey Bayou Records.  It was produced by Tab Benoit. In 2013 Dash Rip Rock played back-up for a one-time only show with southern rock pioneers Jim "Dandy" Mangum and Rickey Lee “Risky” Reynolds of Black Oak Arkansas. In 2014 Punk News announced that Bill Davis of Dash Rip Rock would be appearing on lead guitar and lead vocals on a track on a forthcoming Black Oak Arkansas tribute album with Greg Ginn of Black Flag, Paul Leary and Jeff Pinkus of Butthole Surfers,  Shooter Jennings, and others. Mutants of the Monster: A Tribute to Black Oak Arkansas was released by Saustex Records in 2016.

In 2014, Davis was writing for both a forthcoming solo release and a new Dash Rip Rock record and playing live with Dash Rip Rock. He spoke with a New Orleans journalist about some of his earliest guitar influences:
 
"A bunch of really strange guitar players I met in the 80s really influenced me. Danny Gatton, who committed suicide, was one of the most monstrous Telecaster players to ever walk the planet. Gatton worked with another guy I met named Evan Johns. They were both from Washington, D.C. and played in rockabilly bands, but the rockabilly kind of turned punk. Evan introduced me to Danny Gatton’s style," Davis said. "Going way back, I loved Ace Frehley from Kiss. It was really simple. I like guitar that has a country flavor. Pete Townshend is another one, and Bily Zoom from the band X really inspired the punk rock side of my style."

Dash Rip Rock regularly plays live. Recent gigs include Outlaw Country Cruise, French Quarter Festival, Bandito Festival, Voodoo Festival, and many club shows, etc.

Discography

Studio albums
 Dash Rip Rock (1986, 688 Records)
 Ace of Clubs (1989, Mammoth Records)
 Not of This World (1990, Mammoth Records)
 Tiger Town (1993, Doctor Dream Records)
 Get You Some of Me (1996, Ichiban Records/Naked Language Records)
 Paydirt (1998, P.C. Records)
 Sonic Boom (2002, Write On Records)
 Hee Haw Hell (2007, Alternative Tentacles)
 Country Girlfriend (2008, Abitian)
 Call of the Wild (2010, Alternative Tentacles)
 Black Liquor (2012, Alternative Tentacles)
 Dash Does Shaver (2013, Whiskey Bayou Records)
 Wrongheaded (2015, Drag Snake Records)
 Cherchez La Femme (2021, Drag Snake Records)

Live albums
 Boiled Alive! (1991, Mammoth Records)

Compilations
 Dash Rip Rock's Gold Record (1996, Ichiban)
 Recyclone (2004, Alternative Tentacles)

See also
Louisiana Music Hall of Fame

References

External links
Dash Rip Rock official site
Facebook.com
Alternative Tentacles Artist page
ArtistDirect
Bill Davis of Dash's record with Mojo Nixon, John Doe, Country Dick Montana, Luther Dickinson, produced by Jim Dickinson
Link to Dash Rip Rock on Rock Band video game

Alternative Tentacles artists
Musical groups from Louisiana
Musicians from Louisiana
Musical groups from New Orleans
Musical groups established in 1984
Cowpunk musical groups
Rockabilly music groups
Albums produced by Jim Dickinson
Culture of the Southern United States